William Aldrich (January 19, 1820 – December 3, 1885) was an American Republican politician who served as  Congressman from the state of Illinois.

Biography
He was born in Greenfield Center in the Town of Greenfield in New York. He attended local schools and taught school himself.

Aldrich moved to Michigan and then to Two Rivers, Wisconsin, where he worked as a shopkeeper and manufacturer. He served as superintendent of schools from 1855 to 1856 and chairman of the county board of supervisors from 1857 to 1858. In 1859 he was elected to the Wisconsin State Assembly. He moved to Chicago, Illinois in 1861 and opened another shop.

He served as congressman from 1877 to 1883 after having earlier served in the Chicago City Council in 1876.

Aldrich died in Fond du Lac, Wisconsin. He is buried in Rosehill Cemetery in Chicago.  His son, James Franklin Aldrich also became a Congressman, holding the same congressional seat as his father.

References

External links

1820 births
1885 deaths
People from Greenfield, New York
Burials at Rosehill Cemetery
Chicago City Council members
Republican Party members of the Wisconsin State Assembly
Republican Party members of the United States House of Representatives from Illinois
19th-century American politicians